Nemophora lapikiella is a moth of the Adelidae family or fairy longhorn moths. It was described by Kozlov in 1997. It is found in the Russian Far East and Japan.

References

Adelidae
Moths described in 1997
Moths of Japan
Moths of Asia